Carin Götblad (born January 1, 1956) is Police Commissioner (länspolismästare) of Stockholm County since May 5, 2003. She received her law degree (Candidate of Law) in 1987.

References

Swedish police officers
1956 births
Living people
Place of birth missing (living people)
People from Stockholm County